is a Japanese former Nippon Professional Baseball infielder.

References 

1969 births
Living people
Baseball people from Ehime Prefecture 
Japanese baseball players
Nippon Professional Baseball infielders
Kintetsu Buffaloes players
Osaka Kintetsu Buffaloes players
Orix Buffaloes players
Nippon Professional Baseball coaches
Japanese baseball coaches